Seven Wonders of the Industrial World is a 7-part British docudrama television miniseries that originally aired from  to  on BBC and was later released on DVD. The programme examines seven engineering feats that occurred since the Industrial Revolution. The same feats are covered in a companion book of the same name by producer Deborah Cadbury.

Production
The programmes were dramatised versions of actual events: actors played the various figures involved, reciting monologues and dialogue based on their letters and writings. It cost approximately £1 million to create the 7-part documentary. A book of the same name was released by producer Deborah Cadbury, exploring the same feats.

Awards
2004 British Academy Television Awards
Nominated: Huw Wheldon Award for Factual Series or Strand
2004 British Academy Television Craft Awards
Nominated: Best Photography (Factual): Mike Spragg
RTS Television Awards 2004
Nominated: Best Production Design (Entertainment & Non Drama)
Nominated: Best Science & Natural History

Episodes

The Great Ship
This episode focuses on the construction of the SS Great Eastern, designed by Isambard Kingdom Brunel to be both the first ship entirely made out of iron and the most luxurious vessel of the day. However, while the ship itself was a marvel of shipbuilding, its construction was marred by accidents, scandal and misfortune, including a fire that practically destroyed the shipbuilder's yard, problems with the launch and financial scandals, all of which contributed towards Brunel's deteriorating health and comparatively early demise in 1859 and the popular belief that the ship was jinxed (a rumour leading to the legend of two bodies being found trapped in the hull upon its dismantling).

The Brooklyn Bridge
Focusing on the construction of the Brooklyn Bridge, the episode examines the family that built it—John Augustus Roebling, who designed the bridge; his son, Washington Roebling, who took over construction following his father's death shortly after the project was announced; and Washington's wife Emily Roebling, who taught herself engineering principles and took on the burden of her husband's work after his health was destroyed by the decompression sickness he suffered, owing to the length of time he spent working and overseeing matters in the pressured atmosphere of the underwater caissons used to build the bridge.

Bell Rock Lighthouse
This episode tells the story of the construction in the early 19th century of the offshore lighthouse on Bell Rock, by the Scottish engineer Robert Stevenson. Bell or Inchcape Rock was underwater except for a couple of hours at low tide each day. It had claimed the lives of sailors and sunk ships for hundreds of years, but its situation caused difficulties in producing a design that would stand up to the storms and waves that ravaged the area while simultaneously housing the builders who worked on it during the few months of fair weather available each year.

The Sewer King
Set in London during the 1850s, this episode focusses on the construction of the London sewerage system, built to replace the antiquated medieval system that was overworked and inadequate for the needs of the then-largest metropolis in the world, causing epidemics of disease and a permanent foul stench to fill the air also known as the Great Stink. The episode follows the efforts and work of Joseph Bazalgette, the brilliant engineer who designed the influential and modern sewer system that would purify the city, transform the streets above and would result in the end of the epidemics of cholera and typhoid that had ravaged the population—although, ironically not for the reasons that he initially thought. (This episode was written by Gregory Evans and directed and produced by Bazalgette's great-great-grandson, Edward Bazalgette)

The Panama Canal
This episode presents the French and American efforts to build a canal through Panama to link the Atlantic Ocean with the Pacific Ocean. The first attempt to construct the canal by Ferdinand de Lesseps, the builder of the Suez Canal, was abandoned because of tropical diseases (which killed over 22,000 men) and the difficulty of constructing a sea-level canal through the mountains. The resulting financial scandals not only ruined de Lesseps and many investors, it also brought down the French government. The episode then takes up the story seventeen years later when the United States took up the challenge. A concentrated effort succeeded in eradicating the causes of the tropical diseases, but the attempt to build a sea-level canal once again failed.  Instead the canal was built with locks.

The Line

The episode follows the construction of the First transcontinental railroad, the first transcontinental rail system, which would unite the eastern and western seaboards of the United States. Started in Sacramento by a consortium of local shopkeepers with no experience in building a railroad, the episode follows their efforts to build from west to east through the forbidding Sierra Nevada mountains with the help of Chinese labourers whilst simultaneously following the efforts of the workers of the Union Pacific to build from east to west, and their problems in dealing with the lawless nature of the Wild West, attacks by hostile Indians, and financial corruption and scandal.

The Hoover Dam
The final episode focuses on the construction of the Hoover Dam during the Great Depression of the 1930s, focusing in particular on the ruthless pace set by Frank Crowe, the builder, whose eagerness to complete the project well before schedule and subsequent exploitation of the workforce (who were desperate for any employment and were forced to accept conditions of extreme hardship in the process) resulted in many deaths and the eventual construction of a new city to house the workers.

Media information

DVD release

Companion book

See also
 Wonders of the World

References

External links
 
 

2003 British television series debuts
2003 British television series endings
2003 books
BBC television docudramas
Industrial history of the United Kingdom
Science docudramas